The Pyrénées – Mont Perdu World Heritage Site (also known as UNESCO Patrimonio Mundial Pirineos – Monte Perdido in Spanish) is a World Heritage Site straddling the border between Spain and France in the Pyrenees mountain chain. The summit of Monte Perdido (French: Mont Perdu) is on the Spanish side of the border. The site was designated in 1997 and extended north in 1999 to include the Commune of Gèdre in France.

The site includes two bordering national parks: the entire Ordesa y Monte Perdido National Park in Spain and the eastern part of Pyrénées Occidentales National Park in France.
The World Heritage Site comprises a total area of 30,639 hectares.

Description and History
Centered on Monte Perdido, the world heritage site includes many quintessential geological landforms, including two of Europe's largest canyons on the Spanish site and cirque walls on the French site. Along the mountain slopes are meadows, caves, forests, and lakes. Although the Alps and the Caucasus Mountains both have higher biodiversity and endemism than the Pyrenees, the Pyrenees are somewhat less affected by recent human development that other European mountain ranges. However, like all mountain ranges in Europe, they show a consistent history of human occupation dating from the Paleolithic. These include a dolmen on the Spanish side and stone circles on the Cirque de Gavarnie. The villages and settlements that dot the landscape arose in the Middle Ages and are located in the valleys around Monte Perdido, using the runoff to irrigate their fields. A distinct pastoral system developed, where the livestock would move up and down the mountain slopes with the seasons.  

Because each settlement has more in common with the neighboring settlements in the Pyrenees than they do with the rest of their respective sovereign nations (Spain and France), they have a degree of independence, and Spanish farmers are often allowed to graze on the French side and vice versa, in a system called "transhumance".

References

External links
UNESCO Pyrénées - Mont Perdu unesco.org, retrieved 2013-08-20 (in French)
"UNESCO Patrimonio Mundial Pirineos – Monte Perdido " mcu.es, retrieved 2013-08-20 (in Spanish)
MPPM - Monte Perdido Patrimonio Mundial mppm.org, retrieved 2013-08-20 (in Spanish)

Transboundary protected areas
World Heritage Sites in France
World Heritage Sites in Spain